Arthur ("Art") Leon Burns (born July 19, 1954) is a retired discus thrower from the United States. He finished in fifth place (64.98 metres) at the 1984 Summer Olympics, just behind his medal winning compatriots Mac Wilkins (silver) and John Powell (bronze).

Achievements

References
 USA Olympic Team
 1984 Year Ranking

1954 births
Living people
Place of birth missing (living people)
American male discus throwers
Athletes (track and field) at the 1984 Summer Olympics
Olympic track and field athletes of the United States
Athletes (track and field) at the 1987 Pan American Games
Pan American Games track and field athletes for the United States